Dalu Town could refer to the following:

China
In Chinese the name of these locations are all written as "大路镇"

Dalu, Bishan County, Chongqing
Dalu, Qionghai, Hainan
Dalu, Jungar Banner, Ordos, Inner Mongolia
Dalu, Zhenjiang, in Jiangxin District, Zhenjiang, Jiangsu
Dalu, Ji'an, Jilin

India
Dalu, Meghalaya, in West Garo Hills district, Meghalaya, India